Garrett is an unincorporated community in northern Albany County, Wyoming, United States, along the North Laramie River. It lies along local roads north of the city of Laramie, the county seat of Albany County. Although Garrett is unincorporated, it once had a post office, with the ZIP code of 82058. The building remains, though is no longer in use. Garrett is also home to River Bridge School, a one-room schoolhouse that is part of Albany County School District #1. Aside from the schoolhouse, the land is privately owned.

References

Unincorporated communities in Albany County, Wyoming
Unincorporated communities in Wyoming